Carl (or Karl) Theodor Hilsenberg (11 March 1802 – 11 September 1824) was a German naturalist, botanist and ornithologist, who collected plants in Madagascar and Mauritius.  He described the sooty albatross in 1822.

References 

1802 births
1824 deaths
19th-century German botanists
German ornithologists